Eupithecia himalayata is a moth in the family Geometridae. It is found in Nepal.

The wingspan is about 17.5–20 mm. The forewings are rusty brown and the hindwings are lighter rusty brown.

References

Moths described in 2010
himalayata
Moths of Asia